Particularly serious crime in the Immigration and Nationality Act (INA) of the United States is a predecessor of the current aggravated felony. The term "particularly serious crime" was coined for the first time when the U.S. Congress enacted the Refugee Act in 1980. 

The term "particularly serious crime" was created in 1980 during the enactment of Refugee Act. 

Aliens who have been convicted of particularly serious crimes (and found by the U.S. Attorney General to be dangers to the community of the United States) are statutorily precluded from receiving asylum or a grant of withholding of removal under 8 U.S.C. § 1231(b)(3)(B).

References
This article in most part is based on law of the United States, including statutory and latest published case law.

External links
"Particularly Serious Crime" Bars on Asylum and Withholding of Removal: Case Law Standards and Sample Determinations (UNHCR)
New Way Forward Act: Title III, Sec. 302(c) (Particularly Serious Crime)

American legal terminology
Criminal law
United States immigration law